Air Commodore Kenneth Joseph Goodwin CBE AFC was a British pilot who was commanding officer of No. 74 Squadron RAF from 1966 to 1969 and former Air Officer Commanding Air Cadets and Commandant Air Training Corps from 1979 to 1982.

References

Royal Air Force officers
Commanders of the Order of the British Empire
Recipients of the Air Force Cross (United Kingdom)